The Cordillera Darwin is an extensive mountain range mantled by an ice field that is located in Chile.

Description
Cordillera Darwin is located in the southwestern portion of Isla Grande de Tierra del Fuego, entirely within the Chilean territory. The Darwin Range extends in a west–east direction from the Monte Sarmiento (located in the vicinity of Magdalena Channel) to Yendegaia Valley. It is bounded by the Almirantazgo Fjord on the north and the Beagle Channel on the south. The range is named after Charles Darwin and is the most important feature of Alberto de Agostini National Park, which includes a number of well-known glaciers including the Marinelli Glacier, which is now under prolonged retreat as of 2008.

In October 2011, a team of French mountaineers from the French Army's Groupe Militaire de Haute Montagne announced the first crossing of the Cordillera Darwin in a 29-day trip which included an ascent of Mount Darwin, the highest peak in the range.

Major peaks

 Monte Darwin
 Monte Sarmiento
 Monte Italia
 Monte Bove
 Monte Roncagli
 Monte Luis de Saboya
 Monte Della Vedova
 Monte Buckland

See also
 Ainsworth Bay, Chile
 Cordillera Darwin Metamorphic Complex

Notes

External links 

 C. Michael Hogan. 2008 Bahia Wulaia Dome Middens, Megalithic Portal, ed. Andy Burnham
 United States Geological Survey (USGS). 1999. ''Southern Patagonia Icefield and Southernmost Andes Icefield
 Darwin exploration by the French explorer Christian Clot Darwin exploration (In French)

Darwin
Landforms of Magallanes Region
Ice fields of South America
Isla Grande de Tierra del Fuego